Eva-Maria Edinger (born 13 June 1966) is a former synchronized swimmer from Austria.

References 

1966 births
Living people
Austrian synchronized swimmers
Olympic synchronized swimmers of Austria
Synchronized swimmers at the 1984 Summer Olympics